The following is a complete list of all volumes of The Spectacular Spider-Man, with notes for each issue.

Spectacular Spider-Man Magazine (1968)
The Spectacular Spider-Man was initially a two-issue magazine published by Marvel in 1968, as an experiment in entering the black-and-white comic-magazine market successfully pioneered by Warren Publishing and others. It sold for 35 cents when standard comic books cost 12 cents and Annuals and Giants 25 cents. It represented the first Spider-Man spin-off publication aside from the original series' summer Annuals, begun in 1964.

The first issue (cover-dated July 1968) featured a painted, color cover by men's adventure-magazine artist Harry Rosenbaum, in acrylic paint on illustration board, over layouts by The Amazing Spider-Man artist John Romita Sr. The 52-page black-and-white Spider-Man story, "Lo, This Monster!", was by writer Stan Lee, penciler Romita Sr. and inker Jim Mooney. A 10-page origin story, "In The Beginning!", was by Lee, penciler Larry Lieber and inker Bill Everett.

The feature story was reprinted in color, with some small alterations and bridging material by Gerry Conway, in The Amazing Spider-Man #116–118 (Jan.–March 1973) as "Suddenly...the Smasher!",  "The Deadly Designs of the Disruptor!", and "Countdown to Chaos!" (with additional inking by Tony Mortellaro on the latter two). These versions were themselves reprinted in Marvel Tales #95–97 (Sept.-Oct. 1978).

The second and final issue (Nov. 1968) also sported a painted cover and the interior was in color as well. Lee, Romita and Mooney again collaborated on its single story, "The Goblin Lives!", featuring the Green Goblin. A next-issue box at the end promoted the planned contents of the unrealized issue #3, "The Mystery of the TV Terror". A version of the Goblin story, trimmed by 18 pages, was reprinted in The Amazing Spider-Man Annual #9 (1973), and portions of the "TV Terror" costume were reused for the costume of the Prowler.

Peter Parker, The Spectacular Spider-Man #1–100 (October 1976 – January 1985)

Peter Parker, The Spectacular Spider-Man #100–133 (February 1985 – October 1987)

The Spectacular Spider-Man #134–200 (November 1987 – March 1993)

The Spectacular Spider-Man #201–263 (April 1993 – September 1998)

The Spectacular Spider-Man #264-290 (July 2003 – April 2005)

The Spectacular Spider-Man Vol. 2 #1–27 (July 2003 – April 2005)

Peter Parker: The Spectacular Spider-Man #291–313 (June 2017 – December 2018)

Peter Parker: The Spectacular Spider-Man Vol. 3 #1–6 (June 2017 – November 2017)

Peter Parker: The Spectacular Spider-Man #297–313 (November 2017 – December 2018)

The Spectacular Spider-Man Annuals
1 – [Mantlo/Buckler] "And Men Shall Call Him... Octopus!" – September 1979
2 – [Macchio/Mooney] "Vengeance Is Mine... Sayeth the Word!" – May 1980
3 – [Kraft/Sherman/Weiss] "Dark Side of the Moon" – July 1981
4 – [DeNatale/Mantlo] "Memory Lane!" – July 1984
5 – [David/Beachum] "Ace" – July 1985
6 – [David/Beachum] "Ace II" – July 1986
7 – [Owsley/Kupperberg] "The Honeymoon" – August 1987
8 – [Conway/Gruenwald] "Return to Sender" – July 1988
9 – [Conway/Herdling] "The Serpent in the Shadow" – May 1989
10 – [Conway/Lee] "Into the Microverse" – June 1990
11 – [Conway/Hembeck] "The Ghost and the Machine" – June 1991
12 – [Brevoort/Fein] "Down and Downer" – June 1992
13 – [DeMatteis/Bingham] "Emergence" – July 1993
14 – [DeMatteis/Buscema] "Cycles & Circles" – July 1994
1 – [Zdarksy/Allred] "Paper Trail" – June 2018

Other issues 
 Spectacular Spider-Man Super Special (1995) #1 – [Kavanagh/Lee] Part of the Planet of the Symbiotes storyline.

See also
List of Spider-Man titles

References

External links
Spectacular Spider-Man at SpiderFan.org
Amazing Spider-Man resource information
Marvel Database

Lists of Spider-Man comics
Spectacular Spider-Man
Spectacular Spider-Man